Vakel was the Arabic term used in the meaning of "representative" or "proxy". This term used for the deputies and de facto prime ministers of the Mughal Emperor in Mughal administration. He was considered the most powerful person after Emperor in the Mughal Empire. 

While in the Ottoman Empire, the viziers were considered "absolute delegates" (vekil-i mutlak) of the Ottoman Sultan.

See also
 Wakil - Arabic Islamic term

References

Islamic legal occupations
Ottoman titles